William Stephens is the name of:
 William Stephens (fl. 1650s), Member of Parliament for Newport (Isle of Wight) 1645 and 1659–60
 William Stephens (d. 1697) (1641–1697), (Sir), Member of Parliament for Newport (Isle of Wight) 1685–87 and 1689–95
 William Stephens (minister) (1647–1718), Anglican priest
 William Stephens (governor of Georgia) (1671–1753), governor of the Province of Georgia, 1743–1751; MP for Newport (Isle of Wight) 1702–1722, for Newtown (Isle of Wight) 1722–1727
 William Stephens (glassmaker) (1731–1803), English merchant and glass manufacturer in Portugal
 William Stephens (judge) (1752–1819), U.S. federal judge
 William Stephens (academic) (1829–1890), English-born  headmaster at Sydney Grammar School and professor at the University of Sydney
 William Stephens (Dean of Winchester), (1839–1902), Anglican priest
 William Stephens (Australian politician), (1857–1925), Australian politician
 William Stephens (American politician) (1859–1944), American politician.
 William Stephens (cricketer) (1870–1954), New Zealand cricketer
 William Stephens (producer) (1897–1962), American film producer
William Humphries Stephens (b.1737) English sculptor
 William Ward Stephens (1922–1987), American Thoroughbred horse racing trainer
 William E. Stephens, inventor of time-of-flight mass spectrometry in 1946
Bill Stephens (born 1949), American TV host
 William O. Stephens (born 1962), Professor of Philosophy

See also
William Stevens (disambiguation)
 Willis Stephens (born 1955), New York State Assembly politician
William Stephen (disambiguation)